The 2011 Louisiana–Lafayette Ragin' Cajuns football program represented the University of Louisiana at Lafayette in the 2011 NCAA Division I FBS football season. The Ragin' Cajuns were led by first year head coach Mark Hudspeth and played their home games at Cajun Field. They are members of the Sun Belt Conference. They finished the season 9–4 overall and 6–2 in Sun Belt play to finish in third place. They were invited to the New Orleans Bowl, the program's first bowl game, where they defeated San Diego State. However, in 2015 Louisiana–Lafayette vacated eight wins including their New Orleans Bowl victory due to alleged major NCAA violations.

Preseason

Award watchlists

Sun Belt Media Day

Predicted standings

Preseason All–Conference Team

Offense
TE Ladarius Green

Roster

Schedule

Game summaries

@ Oklahoma State

@ Kent State

Nicholls State

@ Florida International

Florida Atlantic

Troy

North Texas

@ Western Kentucky

@ Middle Tennessee

Louisiana-Monroe

@ Arkansas State

@ Arizona

San Diego State (New Orleans Bowl)

References

Louisiana-Lafayette
Louisiana Ragin' Cajuns football seasons
New Orleans Bowl champion seasons
Louisiana-Lafayette Ragin' Cajuns football